John Beaufort, 1st Duke of Somerset, 3rd Earl of Somerset, KG (25 March 1404 – 30 May 1444) was an English nobleman and military commander during the Hundred Years' War. He was the maternal grandfather of Henry VII.

Origins

Born on 25 March 1404, he was the second son of John Beaufort, 1st Earl of Somerset (1371–1410), the eldest of the four legitimised children of John of Gaunt, 1st Duke of Lancaster, by his mistress Katherine Swynford. John of Gaunt was the third surviving son of King Edward III. His mother was Margaret Holland (1385–1439), a daughter of Thomas Holland, 2nd Earl of Kent, the son of Joan "the Fair Maid of Kent", a granddaughter of King Edward I and wife of Edward the Black Prince (eldest brother of John of Gaunt) and mother of King Richard II.

Career
In 1418 he became 3rd Earl of Somerset, having succeeded his elder brother Henry Beaufort, 2nd Earl of Somerset (1401–1418), who died unmarried, aged 17, whilst fighting for the Lancastrian cause at the Siege of Rouen in France, under the command of their uncle Thomas Beaufort, Duke of Exeter (1377–1426).

French campaign & imprisonment
He fought in the 1419 French campaigns of his cousin King Henry V. In 1421 he accompanied his step-father Thomas of Lancaster, Duke of Clarence (the king's younger brother) on a campaign in Anjou, France. Thomas was killed at the Battle of Baugé (22 March 1421), while Somerset and his younger brother were captured and imprisoned for 17 years. On 25 March 1425 Somerset came into his majority, but his paternal estates had to be managed by his mother for the next thirteen years of his imprisonment. He remained imprisoned until 1438 and having been ransomed, became one of the leading English commanders in France.

Created Duke of Somerset

In 1443 John was created Duke of Somerset and Earl of Kendal, was made a Knight of the Garter and appointed Captain-General of Guyenne. He presided over a period during which England lost much territory in France and proved a poor commander. Humphrey of Lancaster, 1st Duke of Gloucester, regent for the young King Henry VI, was unable to control the administration of justice and finance, which led to widespread lawlessness. At the beginning of the second lieutenantcy of Richard, Duke of York, Gloucester declined the office of Lieutenant-Governor, which was then accepted by Somerset, who drew from it a salary of 600 pounds.

He was appointed Admiral of the Sea to the army commander John Talbot, 1st Earl of Shrewsbury, who from August 1440 besieged Harfleur, which had been in French hands for five months. King Charles VII of France sent a large army under Richemont. The English dug a double ditch rampart with only 1,000 men, while Somerset's squadron prevented a French landing by sea, using archers to pick off the enemy at short range. Having been thus frustrated the French withdrew to Paris and lifted the siege. The town surrendered to the English and was re-occupied. York was incensed that John's uncle Cardinal Henry Beaufort advised the king to sue for peace. Somerset advised King Henry that peace was humanitarian and that the king of France was determined to seize Pontoise. When York arrived in Normandy in 1441 to the campaign, Somerset had resigned. But the fall of Pontoise to Charles, Duke of Orléans in September 1441 weakened English garrisons and in Gascony the situation was even worse. The Beauforts sent Sir Edward Hull, who arrived at Bordeaux on 22 October 1442, to inform York that a huge army would arrive commanded by Somerset. York was ordered to fortify Rouen; just as the king and Dauphin of France were threatening Bordeaux and Aquitaine and seized the town of Dax Somerset dithered; York was held back as Guyenne was being lost.

Meanwhile, the Duke of York, fighting alongside the tactician Lord Talbot, had been appointed Lieutenant for all France. With the Duke of Gloucester's wife Eleanor charged with treason, Somerset took the opportunity in April 1443 to declare himself Lieutenant of Aquitaine and Captain-General of Guyenne. By then, the negotiations Somerset had started as Captain-General of Calais had failed. These two factors turned York against the Beauforts. But the last straw was the payment of £25,000 to Somerset while York remained heavily in debt. Furthermore, Guyenne was consuming precious resources otherwise destined for Normandy.

Death & burial
In August 1443 Somerset led 7,000 men to Cherbourg and marched south to Gascony; the duke was ill. He blundered into Guerche, a Breton town with which England had signed a peace treaty. But Somerset set all prisoners free, accepting money from the Duke of Brittany. Marching aimlessly through Maine, he returned that winter to England. His death in 1444, possibly by suicide, and that of his uncle the Cardinal, marked the end of Beaufort influence and left the door open for William de la Pole, 1st Duke of Suffolk, to dominate the government. The lasting effect of these events was burning resentment between the House of York and the remaining members of the Beaufort family.

Marriage & issue
In 1439 he married Margaret Beauchamp, a daughter of Sir John Beauchamp, de jure 3rd Baron Beauchamp (d.1412/14) of Bletsoe in Bedfordshire, by his second wife Edith Stourton, a daughter of Sir John Stourton of Stourton, Wiltshire. By his wife he had an only daughter and sole heiress:
Lady Margaret Beaufort (1443–1509), who married Edmund Tudor, 1st Earl of Richmond (1430–1456) by whom she was the mother of King Henry VII, the first of the Tudor dynasty.

Succession
As he died without male issue his dukedom went extinct but his earldom passed to his younger brother Edmund Beaufort, 2nd Duke of Somerset (1406–1455). As Edmund was later granted the title Duke of Somerset, he is often called 2nd Duke of Somerset though he did not inherit the title from his brother.

Illegitimate issue
His illegitimate issue included:
 Tacine of Somerset, who, being foreign-born, was made a denizen of England 20 June 1443. She married (before 29 September 1447) Reynold (or Reginald) Grey, 7th Lord Grey of Wilton by whom she had one son:
 John Grey, 8th Lord Grey of Wilton; 
 John of Somerset (c.1444–1453)

Titles and styles
 1st Duke of Somerset (28 August 1443 – 27 May 1444)
 1st Earl of Kendal (28 August 1443 – 27 May 1444)
 3rd Earl of Somerset (25 November 1418 – 27 May 1444)

Ancestry and family tree

References

Notes

Further reading

External links
 

|-

1404 births
1444 deaths
John Beaufort, 1st Duke of Somerset
 Burials at Wimborne Minster (church)
101
 Earls of Kendal
 Earls of Somerset
 Knights of the Garter
 People of the Hundred Years' War